NGC 115 is a barred spiral galaxy located in the southern constellation of Sculptor. It was discovered by the British astronomer John Herschel on September 25, 1834. The galaxy is approximately 85 million light-years from the Sun, and is about 50,000 light-years in diameter, nearly half the size of our home galaxy, the Milky Way.

References

External links
 
 

0115
NGC 0115
NGC 0115
001651
Astronomical objects discovered in 1834
Discoveries by John Herschel